Melvin Charles Bradford, professionally known as Mel-Man, is an American West Coast hip hop record producer and songwriter from Pittsburgh, Pennsylvania. Signed with Aftermath Entertainment, he is best known for his work with Dr. Dre, producing songs for the likes of Eminem, Xzibit, Truth Hurts, The Firm, Busta Rhymes and Snoop Dogg.

A man named Michael Lowe filed a copyright infringement lawsuit against Xzibit, Dr. Dre and Bradford about the song "X".

Credits

References

External links 

Living people
American male composers
Musicians from Pittsburgh
21st-century American composers
Record producers from Pennsylvania
21st-century American male musicians
Year of birth missing (living people)